The  is the prefectural parliament of Ibaraki Prefecture.

Members
As of 23 August 2019
Source:

References

External links
Official website (Japanese)

Prefectural assemblies of Japan
Politics of Ibaraki Prefecture